The list of ship launches in 1735 includes a chronological list of some ships launched in 1735.


References

1735
Ship launches